Jean-Luc Fournet (25 February 1965, Bordeaux) is a French papyrologist.

A former scientific member of the Institut Français d'Archéologie Orientale in Cairo (1992–1996), he was appointed chargé de recherche at the CNRS (1996–2004). He was elected  at the École pratique des hautes études (IVe section, historical and philological sciences) in Greek papyrology in 2004 and professor at the Collège de France to the chair "Culture écrite de l'Antiquité tardive et papyrologie byzantine" in 2015.

Bibliography 
 Hellénisme dans l'Égypte du VIe siècle. La bibliothèque et l'œuvre de Dioscore d'Aphrodité, Cairo, IFAO, 1999.
 Les archives de Dioscore d'Aphrodité cent ans après leur découverte – Histoire et culture dans l'Égypte byzantine, Paris, De Boccard, 2009.
 Alexandrie : une communauté linguistique ? ou la question du grec alexandrin, IFAO, 2009.
 (with A. Tihon), “Conformément aux observations d’Hipparque” : le Papyrus Fouad inv. 267A (Publications de l’Institut Orientaliste de Louvain 67), Louvain-La-Neuve 2014
 Nombreux articles dans le domaine de la papyrologie, de la culture de l'Antiquité tardive et des inscriptions amphoriques protobyzantines.

External links 
 Jean-Luc Fournet on data.bnf.fr
 Papyrologie : leçon inaugurale de Jean-Luc Fournet
 Enseignement au Collège de France
 CV et bibliographie complète

Scientists from Bordeaux
1965 births
French papyrologists
French Byzantinists
Academic staff of the École pratique des hautes études
Academic staff of the Collège de France
Living people